Norman "Norm" Smith (1 October 1946 – 21 February 2019) was an Australian rules footballer who played with Hawthorn in the Victorian Football League (VFL).

Early career and Hawthorn
Smith, a ruck-rover, played his early senior football at Strathmerton in the Murray Football League and won the league's best and fairest medal in 1966. The following year he made five VFL appearances for Hawthorn, then spent time away from the game on national service, before returning to Strathmerton in 1970.

Goulburn Valley Football League
In 1971, Smith started playing in the Goulburn Valley Football League, where he won back-to-back Morrison Medals, with Tatura in 1974 and Lemnos in 1975.

Ovens & Murray Football League
His two-year stint coaching Corowa, in 1977 and 1978, was the final two seasons that the club played in the Ovens & Murray Football League, before merging with Rutherglen.

Canberra
In 1979 he coached Belconnen to its first Australian Capital Territory Football League grand final, which they lost to Ainslie. From 1980 to 1982, Smith played at West Canberra. He was coach in the last of those years and again for the 1985 season, in a non-playing capacity. In 1986 he was non-playing coach of the Belconnen Magpies, formed by a merger between Belconnen and West Canberra.
 
Brent Smith, Norman's son, also played football in Canberra and in 1991 won the Mulrooney Medal.

References

1946 births
Australian rules footballers from Victoria (Australia)
Hawthorn Football Club players
Tatura Football Club players
Shepparton Swans Football Club players
Corowa Football Club players
Corowa Football Club coaches
Belconnen Football Club players
2019 deaths